Swallow: A Tale of the Great Trek is an 1899 novel by H. Rider Haggard, set in South Africa during the Boer Trek of 1836.

Adaptation
The novel was adapted into a 1922 South African film.

References

External links
Complete book at Project Gutenberg
Images and bibliographic information for various editions of Swallow at SouthAfricaBooks.com

Novels by H. Rider Haggard
1899 British novels
Fiction set in 1836
British novels adapted into films
Novels set in South Africa